Regina Jaquess (born 1984) is an American water skier. She had won awards in the sport by age 13 and won medals in Water skiing at the 2003 Pan American Games. In that same year she won at the Water Ski World Championship. She won gold medals in Water skiing at the 2011 Pan American Games and for 2012-2013 was named "Female Slalom Skier of the Year" by Water Ski Magazine.

In December 2016, the International Waterski and Wakeboard Federation's (IWWF) Tournament Council approved Jaquess' November 5, 2016 world record of three and a half buoys at 10.25 meters (41' off) as part of the Malibu Boats team.

On July 6, 2019 Jaquess set a new world record of 4.5 buoys at 10.25 meters (41' off) during the Regina Jaquess Open II tournament at Lymanland in Duncanville, Alabama.  The record was approved by the IWWF Tournament Council in July 2019.

References

External links 
 

1984 births
Living people
American water skiers
World Games gold medalists
Pan American Games medalists in water skiing
Pan American Games gold medalists for the United States
Pan American Games silver medalists for the United States
Competitors at the 2013 World Games
Competitors at the 2022 World Games
Water skiers at the 2015 Pan American Games
Water skiers at the 2003 Pan American Games
Water skiers at the 2011 Pan American Games
Water skiers at the 2007 Pan American Games
Water skiers at the 2019 Pan American Games
Medalists at the 2003 Pan American Games
Medalists at the 2007 Pan American Games
Medalists at the 2011 Pan American Games
Medalists at the 2015 Pan American Games
Medalists at the 2019 Pan American Games
20th-century American women
21st-century American women